Oenothera primiveris is a species of flowering plant in the evening primrose family known by the common names yellow desert evening primrose, bottle evening-primrose, and desert evening-primrose.

Habitat
It is native to the southwestern United States and northern Mexico.

It grows below  in many types of flat desert habitats, including Creosote bush scrub, Joshua tree woodland, and Pinyon-juniper woodland. It is found in the Mojave Desert.

Description
Oenothera primiveris is a hairy annual herb producing a dense rosette of leaves in which the inflorescence occurs. There is generally no true stem.

The green or grayish leaves are up to 28 centimeters long and have wavy or crinkled edges, or are cut into deep lobes or teeth.

Flowers arise from the axils of the leaves. Its bloom period is February through May.

Subspecies
 Oenothera primiveris subsp. bufonis — Large yellow desert primrose, endemic to the Mojave Desert in California & Nevada.
 Oenothera primiveris subsp. primiveris

References

External links
 Calflora Database: Oenothera primiveris (Yellow desert evening primrose)
Jepson Manual eFlora (TJM2) treatment of Oenothera primiveris
UC CalPhotos gallery of Oenothera primiveris images

primiveris
North American desert flora
Flora of the California desert regions
Flora of Northwestern Mexico
Flora of Arizona
Flora of Nevada
Flora of New Mexico
Flora of Texas
Flora of Utah
Flora of the Colorado Plateau and Canyonlands region
Natural history of the Mojave Desert
Night-blooming plants
Taxa named by Asa Gray
Flora without expected TNC conservation status